Liverpool University Press (LUP), founded in 1899, is the third oldest university press in England after Oxford University Press and Cambridge University Press. As the press of the University of Liverpool, it specialises in modern languages, literatures, history, and visual culture and currently publishes more than 150 books a year, as well as 34 academic journals. LUP's books are distributed in North America by Oxford University Press.

History
One of the earliest heads of the press was Lascelles Abercrombie, the first poetry lecturer at the university.

In 2013, LUP acquired the rights to the University of Exeter Press' publications on archaeology, medieval studies, history, classics and ancient history, landscape studies.

In 2014, the company announced the launch of Modern Languages Open, its peer-reviewed open access online platform publishing research from across the modern languages.

In 2015, the press launched Pavilion Poetry, a new imprint publishing collections of contemporary poetry. Mona Arshi was one of the first poets to be published, and her book, Small Hands, won The Felix Dennis Prize for Best First Collection at the 2015 Forward Prizes for Poetry.

Collaborations and activities
The press has ongoing collaborations with Tate, Foundation for Art and Creative Technology, Bluecoat Chambers, Public Monuments and Sculpture Association, and National Museums Liverpool. 

It is one of thirteen publishers to participate in the Knowledge Unlatched pilot, a global library consortium approach to funding open access books.

Awards
The press was shortlisted for the Independent Publishing Awards in 2012, 2013 and 2014, and in 2015 won the IPG Award for Academic and Professional Publisher of the Year. In the same year, the press won the Bookseller Industry Award for Independent Academic, Educational and Professional Publisher of the Year.

Journals
Journals published by LUP include:
Bulletin of Hispanic Studies (since 1923)
The Indexer (since 2019; prior to that published by the Society of Indexers since 1958)

Town Planning Review (TPR) (since 1910), which is edited from the Universities of Liverpool, Manchester and Clemson University in the United States, and supported by an international Editorial Board

References

Further reading 
Droop, J. P. The University Press of Liverpool: A Record of Progress, 1899–1946, with a Catalogue of All Publications. Liverpool University Press, 1947

External links 
 
 Modern Languages Open

University presses of the United Kingdom
University of Liverpool
Publishing companies established in 1899
Book publishing companies of the United Kingdom
1899 establishments in England